The 2017 Western & Southern Open  was a men's and women's tennis tournament played on outdoor hard courts from August 14–20, 2017. It was a Masters 1000 tournament on the 2017 ATP World Tour and a WTA Premier 5 tournament on the 2017 WTA Tour. The tournament was one of two headline events in the 2017 US Open Series. The 2017 tournament was the 116th men's edition and the 89th women's edition of the Cincinnati Masters. The tournament was held annually at the Lindner Family Tennis Center in Mason, a northern suburb of Cincinnati, in the United States.

Marin Čilić and Karolína Plíšková were the defending champions in men's and women's singles titles. Čilić withdrew due to an adductor injury before the tournament began, while Plíšková lost in the semifinals to Garbiñe Muguruza.

Points and prize money

Point distribution

Prize money

ATP singles main-draw entrants

Seeds
The following are the seeded players. Seedings are based on ATP rankings as of August 7, 2017. Rankings and points before are as of August 14, 2017.

Other entrants
The following players received wild cards into the main singles draw:
  Jared Donaldson
  Stefan Kozlov
  Tommy Paul
  Frances Tiafoe

The following players received entry from the singles qualifying draw:
  Alexandr Dolgopolov
  Christopher Eubanks
  Mitchell Krueger
  Maximilian Marterer
  John-Patrick Smith
  João Sousa
  Mikhail Youzhny

The following players received entry as lucky losers:
  Thomas Fabbiano
  Christian Harrison
  Ramkumar Ramanathan
  Janko Tipsarević

Withdrawals
Before the tournament
  Marin Čilić →replaced by  Chung Hyeon
  Pablo Cuevas →replaced by  Kyle Edmund
  Novak Djokovic (elbow injury) →replaced by  Borna Ćorić
  Roger Federer (back injury) →replaced by  Thomas Fabbiano
  Andy Murray (hip injury) →replaced by  Daniil Medvedev
  Gaël Monfils →replaced by  Ramkumar Ramanathan
  Kei Nishikori (right wrist injury) →replaced by  Janko Tipsarević
  Lucas Pouille →replaced by  Nikoloz Basilashvili
  Milos Raonic (left wrist injury) →replaced by  Christian Harrison
  Gilles Simon →replaced by  Jiří Veselý
  Stan Wawrinka (knee injury) →replaced by  Benoît Paire

ATP doubles main-draw entrants

Seeds

 Rankings are as of August 7, 2017

Other entrants
The following pairs received wildcards into the doubles main draw:
  Jared Donaldson /  Stefan Kozlov
  Jack Sock /  Jackson Withrow

Withdrawals
During the tournament
 Roberto Bautista Agut

WTA singles main-draw entrants

Seeds

 Rankings are as of August 7, 2017

Other entrants
The following players received wild cards into the main singles draw:
  Océane Dodin
  Maria Sharapova
  Sloane Stephens

The following players received entry from the singles qualifying draw:
  Françoise Abanda
  Ashleigh Barty
  Verónica Cepede Royg
  Camila Giorgi
  Beatriz Haddad Maia
  Aleksandra Krunić
  Varvara Lepchenko
  Magda Linette
  Monica Puig
  Aliaksandra Sasnovich
  Taylor Townsend
  Donna Vekić

The following player received entry as a lucky loser:
  Natalia Vikhlyantseva

Withdrawals
Before the tournament
  Maria Sharapova →replaced by  Natalia Vikhlyantseva
  Samantha Stosur →replaced by  Julia Görges

WTA doubles main-draw entrants

Seeds

 Rankings are as of August 7, 2017

Other entrants
The following pair received a wildcard into the doubles main draw:
  Alexa Glatch /  Caty McNally

The following pair received entry as alternates:
   Lyudmyla Kichenok /  Lesia Tsurenko

Withdrawals
Before the tournament
  Ekaterina Makarova

Champions

Men's singles

  Grigor Dimitrov def.  Nick Kyrgios, 6–3, 7–5

Women's singles

  Garbiñe Muguruza def.  Simona Halep, 6–1, 6–0

Men's doubles

  Pierre-Hugues Herbert /  Nicolas Mahut def.  Jamie Murray /  Bruno Soares, 7–6(8–6), 6–4

Women's doubles

  Chan Yung-jan /  Martina Hingis def.  Hsieh Su-wei /  Monica Niculescu, 4–6, 6–4, [10–7]

References

External links